The Agumbe Rainforest Research Station (ARRS) is a field based conservation and research organisation situated inside the Agumbe Reserved Forest at Agumbe in the central Western Ghats of southern India. It forms a part of the Malnad-Kodagu corridor, which also includes the Someshwara, Mookambika, Bhadra, and Sharavati Wildlife Sanctuaries, Kudremukh National Park, and various other forest tracts and reserve forests around Kundapur, Shankaranarayana, Hosanagara, Sringeri, and Thirthahalli.

History

ARRS was founded in 2005, by leading Indian herpetologist Romulus Whitaker. Whitaker saw his very first king cobra (Ophiophagus hannah) here in 1971. He was also extremely taken by the reverence the people in the region showed for snakes, which was a major factor that drove him to establish a research station in Agumbe (Karnataka ). The land is a revenue land was legally procured, the construction and activities are eco friendly and pose no disturbance to the wildlife.

Activities
ARRS managed the world's first radio-telemetry project on the King Cobra (Ophiophagus hannah), which is also the first radio-telemetry study done on any snake in India. Insight gained from this ecological study is being put into practice into king cobra management in the region. ARRS researchers have witnessed various unique behaviors among the species including a male king cobra killing a possibly pregnant female, a rare behavior even among mammals.

ARRS conducts and facilitates a wide variety of research projects, ranging from rainforest ecology, behavioral and population ecology, phenology, geoinformatics and socio economics. Apart from research, ARRS focuses on education and outreach in the local community, schools and colleges. A well-developed volunteer and research intern programme makes the research station an ideal location for those interested in field based research and conservation The research station encourages and provides facilities for graduate and PHD students to conduct projects.

See also
 Madras Crocodile Bank Trust

References

External links

Herpetology
Research stations
Research institutes in Karnataka
2005 establishments in Karnataka
Education in Shimoga district
Buildings and structures in Shimoga district
Educational institutions established in 2005
Indian forest research institutes